The Sakmara (Haqmar) is a river in Russia that drains the southern tip of the Ural Mountains south into the river Ural. It is a right tributary of the Ural, which it meets in Orenburg. The source of the Sakmara is in the Republic of Bashkortostan. Other towns along the Sakmara are Yuldybayevo (Bashkortostan), Kuvandyk, and the railway station Saraktash close to the Wozdwizhenskaya Fortress (Orenburg Oblast).

Major tributaries are the Salmysh and the Bolshoy Ik, both from the north.

The Sakmarian Age of the Permian Period of geological time is named for the Sakmara River.

References

Rivers of Bashkortostan
Rivers of Orenburg Oblast
Ural basin